Bitch Magnet is a career-spanning three-disc box-set of the band Bitch Magnet, released on December 6, 2011 through Temporary Residence Limited. It contains all of the band's recorded output, including two studio albums, an EP, and alternate mixes of previously released songs. The tracks were completely remastered by Alan Douches for their inclusion in the set.

Track listing

Personnel 
Bitch Magnet
Orestes Delatorre – drums
Jon Fine – guitar
Dave Galt – guitar on Umber
Sooyoung Park – bass guitar, vocals
Production and additional personnel
Jeremy DeVine – art direction, design
Alan Douches – remastering

References 

2011 compilation albums
Bitch Magnet albums
Temporary Residence Limited albums